Anthony Chérif Martin (born 24 July 1989) is a French professional footballer who plays as a goalkeeper for  club Cholet.

Career
Martin was born in Nantes. On 31 July 2008, Martin left his youthclub La Roche Vendée Football and signed with Ligue 1 club Paris Saint-Germain F.C. He played only two matches with Paris Saint-Germain and joined La Vitréenne FC in summer 2009.

In September 2017, Martin joined SC Bastia.

In June 2022, Martin returned to Cholet.

Personal life
Born in France, Martin is of Algerian descent.

References

External links
 
 

Living people
1989 births
Footballers from Nantes
Association football goalkeepers
French footballers
French sportspeople of Algerian descent
La Roche VF players
Paris Saint-Germain F.C. players
La Vitréenne FC players
SC Bastia players
SO Cholet players
UE Sant Julià players
Les Herbiers VF players
Ligue 1 players
Championnat National players
Championnat National 2 players
Championnat National 3 players